Ben Federspiel (born 18 May 1981) is a Luxembourgian footballer who currently plays as a defender for FC Lorentzweiler in Luxembourg's third tier.

External links 

1981 births
Living people
Luxembourgian footballers
Luxembourg international footballers
Association football defenders
FC Etzella Ettelbruck players
CS Grevenmacher players
FC Lorentzweiler players
Luxembourg National Division players